The 1982 ECAC South men's basketball tournament (now known as the Colonial Athletic Association men's basketball tournament) was held March 4–6 at the Norfolk Scope in Norfolk, Virginia. 

 upset top-seeded James Madison in the championship game, 58–57, to win their second ECAC South men's basketball tournament. The Monarchs, therefore, earned an automatic bid to the 1982 NCAA tournament. JMU would ultimately also receive an at-large bid.

Bracket

References

Colonial Athletic Association men's basketball tournament
Tournament
ECAC South men's basketball tournament
ECAC South men's basketball tournament
Basketball competitions in Norfolk, Virginia
College basketball tournaments in Virginia